Kate Newell Doggett (1828–1884) was an American botanist and suffragist.

Biography
Doggett née Newell was born in 1828.

In 1869 Doggett was placed charge of the herbarium at the Academy of Science. She was delegate of the National Woman Suffrage Association. In 1873 Doggett established the women's club the Fortnightly of Chicago. It is the oldest women's association in Chicago. In 1874 Doggett translated the French book The Grammar of Painting and Engraving into English.

Douglas died in 1884

References

1828 births
1884 deaths
Clubwomen
American suffragists

Further reading
 The Grammar of Painting and Engraving